These are the statistics for the 2013 FIFA Confederations Cup, an eight-team tournament running from 15 June 2013 through 30 June 2013. The tournament took place in Brazil.

Goalscorers
5 goals
 Fernando Torres
 Fred

4 goals
 Neymar
 Abel Hernández

3 goals

 Javier Hernández
 Nnamdi Oduamadi
 David Villa
 Edinson Cavani
 Luis Suárez

2 goals

 Jô
 Paulinho
 Mario Balotelli
 Shinji Okazaki
 Jordi Alba
 David Silva

1 goal

 Dante
 Davide Astori
 Giorgio Chiellini
 Daniele De Rossi
 Alessandro Diamanti
 Emanuele Giaccherini
 Sebastian Giovinco
 Andrea Pirlo
 Keisuke Honda
 Shinji Kagawa
 Elderson Echiéjilé
 Mikel John Obi
 Juan Mata
 Pedro
 Roberto Soldado
 Jonathan Tehau
 Diego Forlán
 Nicolás Lodeiro
 Diego Lugano
 Diego Pérez

Own goal

 Atsuto Uchida (for Italy)
 Jonathan Tehau (for Nigeria)
 Nicolas Vallar (for Nigeria)

Source: FIFA

Assists
3 assists
 Walter Gargano
 Neymar

2 assists

 Oscar
 Yasuhito Endō
 Brown Ideye
 Ahmed Musa
 David Villa
 Nicolás Lodeiro

1 assist
Twenty-six players

Source: FIFA

Scoring

Man of the Match

Overall statistics
Bold numbers indicate the maximum values in each column.

Stadiums

References

External links
2013 FIFA Confederations Cup at FIFA.com

Statistics